The 1981 Singaporean presidential election was held to elect the next president of Singapore. Devan Nair was elected by the Parliament of Singapore. 

During the election, 58 members of Parliament were present while 14 members were absent.

Nair was sworn in as president on 24 October 1981.

Results

References

Presidential elections in Singapore
Singapore
Presidential election